Marie Ramírez is a Costa Rican ten-pin bowler. She finished in 12th position of the combined rankings at the 2006 AMF World Cup.

Personal life
Ramírez is married to Adolfo Estrada del Llano.

References

Living people
Year of birth missing (living people)
Costa Rican ten-pin bowling players
Place of birth missing (living people)